George "Jorge" Edwards Brown (1780 – March 5, 1848) was an English-born Chilean businessman and politician. He served as President of the Provincial Assembly of Coquimbo, Proprietary Deputy for Vallenar, Deputy for Huasco, Deputy for Andacollo and Deputy for Freirina. He was the founder and patriarch of the Edwards family in Chile.

Initially a sailor and surgeon from England, he deserted his own ship to live in Chile where he then worked as a surgeon and developed mines. A supporter of the patriot cause during the Chilean War of Independence, he served as chief physician-surgeon of the United Restoration Army, and was granted Chilean citizenship in 1818 for his services to the independence cause. He then went on to serve in several political posts.

Early life 
Edwards was born the son of Lord Hugo Mostyn, Baron Vaux and Isabel O'Higgins. His baptism certificate in the parish of Saint Leonard's of London states that he was the son of carpenter John Edwards and his wife Elizabeth Brown. 

He studied medicine at Eton College and graduated from the Royal College of Physicians in London. His first marriage was to a well-known dancer or actress. The marriage was against the will of her parents, so he renounced his surname in public deed, adopting the surnames of his wife's parents; Edwards, for her father, and Brown for her mother. He would use these names thereafter. His first wife died.

In Chile 
Having sailed from a young age in British ships engaged in trade and privateering or looting, Edwards visited Chile for the first time in 1797. In 1803, he enlisted as a surgeon in the British raider “Blackhouse” or “Bacar” which was dedicated to looting and plundering ships and ports in the Spanish colonies in South America. In 1807, Edwards arrived in Chile aboard Bacar which anchored in the bay of Coquimbo and assaulted the unguarded city. 

During the sack of Coquimbo, Jorge Edwards entered the house of Diego de Ossandón to steal, but he found his daughter, Isabel de Ossandón, who he fell in love with immediately. He decided to desert the ship and asking for shelter in the house of Diego Ossandón. Family tradition says that when Edwards did not return to the British ship, they spent three days looking for him through all the houses in the city. Edwards hid for three days, hiding in a barrel of wine from his former shipmates. On the third day Spanish reinforcements arrived, forcing the British to retreat from the city, to continue their raids to the north. Once the Spanish authorities were aware of the presence of Edwards in La Serena, he was arrested and sent to Callao, where he was detained. 

Once released he returned to La Serena in 1805 he was baptized into the Catholic faith. The baptism certificate recognizes that parents are Juan Eduardos (John Edwards) and Isabel Pardo (Elizabeth Brown), Spanish forms of their Welsh and English names respectively. 

Jorge Edwards married his first wife Isabel Ossandón Iribarren in 1807, with whom he had eight children, including Agustín Edwards Ossandón. 

After that he worked as a doctor and surgeon for some years. He then became active in the mining business, and helped discover silver in Arqueros. He also developed mines in Copiapó and Huasco. 

His distinctly anti-Spanish feelings made him a supporter of the patriot cause during the Chilean War of Independence, making donations to build the fleet for the liberation of Peru, commanded by a fellow Brit, Lord Thomas Cochrane. After the Battle of Chacabuco, he was appointed chief physician-surgeon of the United Restoration Army. The Supreme Director of Chile, Bernardo O'Higgins granted Edwards Chilean citizenship in 1818 as a reward for his services to the Independence cause. 

He served as Deputy for Huasco between 1822-1823, Deputy for Andacollo between 1825-1826, Deputy for Freirina between 1826-1828, Deputy for Coquimbo in 1831, and Proprietary Deputy for Vallenar between 1834-1837. 

Widowed in 1834, he married his second wife Ventura Argandoña Subercaseaux, with whom he had children.

Edwards died in La Serena, Chile on March 5, 1848, aged 68.

References

See also
Edwards family

1780 births
1848 deaths
Edwards family
English emigrants to Chile
Chilean businesspeople
Members of the Chamber of Deputies of Chile
Naturalized citizens of Chile